The 2017–2018 Persian Gulf Pro League (formerly known as Iran Pro League) was the 35th season of Iran's Football League and 17th as Persian Gulf Pro League since its establishment in 2001. Persepolis were the defending champions. The season featured 14 teams from the 2016–17 Persian Gulf Pro League and two new teams promoted from the 2016–17 Azadegan League: Pars Jonoubi Jam as champions and Sepidrood. The league started on 27 July 2017 and ended on 27 April 2018. Persepolis won the Pro League title for the fourth time in their history, a total 11th Iranian title.

Teams

Stadia and locations

Number of teams by region

Personnel and kits

Note: Flags indicate national team as has been defined under FIFA eligibility rules. Players may hold more than one non-FIFA nationality.

Managerial changes

Foreign players

The number of foreign players is restricted to four per Persian Gulf Pro League team, including a slot for a player from AFC countries. A team can use four foreign players on the field in each game, including at least one player from the AFC country.

League table

Results

Positions by round

Season statistics

Top scorers

Hat-tricks

Top assists 

Last updated: 13 Oct 2017
Source: Varzesh3.com

Clean Sheets

Scoring

Attendances

Average home attendances

Attendances by round

Notes:Updated to games played on 27 April 2018. Source: Iranleague.ir  Matches with spectator bans are not included in average attendances  Gostaresh played their match against Pars Jonoubi Jam at Sahand  Saipa played their matches against Esteghlal and Persepolis at Takhti Tehran  Zob Ahan played their matches against Foolad, Naft Tehran, Pars Jonoubi Jam, Paykan, Sanat Naft and Siah Jamegan at Naghsh-e Jahan

Highest attendances

Notes:Updated to games played on 27 April 2018. Source: Iranleague.ir

Awards

IFLO Seasonal awards

Navad Monthly awards

See also
 2017–18 Azadegan League
 2016–17 League 2
 2016–17 League 3
 2017–18 Hazfi Cup
 2017 Iranian Super Cup

References

Iran Pro League seasons
Iran